The 2018–19 season was Real Madrid's 88th season in existence, their 36th consecutive season in the top flight of Spanish basketball and 12th consecutive season in the top flight of European basketball.

Players

Squad information

Depth chart

Players in

|}

Players out

|}

Club

Technical staff

Kit

Supplier: Adidas / Sponsor: Universidad Europea

Pre-season and friendlies

{{basketballbox collapsible
 | bg =#BBF3BB | round = Training | date = 8 September 2018 | time = 19:00 (CEST)
 | report = Boxscore
 | teamA = San Pablo Burgos | scoreA = 85
 | teamB = Real Madrid | scoreB = 98
 | Q1 = 20-24 | Q2 = 22-24 | Q3 = 29-22 | Q4 = 14-28
 | points1 = Thompson 15
 | rebounds1 = Huskić, Čančar 8
 | assist1 = Alex Barrera 4
 | rating1 = Thompson 15
 | points2 = Ayón 21
 | rebounds2 = Randolph 8
 | assist2 = Llull 4
 | rating2 = Ayón 22
 | arena = Coliseum Burgos | place = Burgos | attendance = 6,500
 | referee = Carlos Peruga Embid, Martín Caballero Madrid, Andrés Fernández Sánchez
 }}

Competitions

Overview

Liga ACB

League table

Results summary

Results by round

Matches

Results overview

ACB Playoffs

Quarterfinals

Real Madrid win the series 2-0

Semifinals

Real Madrid win the series 3-0

Finals

Real Madrid win the series 3-1

EuroLeague

League table

Results summary

All points scored in extra period(s) will not be counted in the standings, nor for any tie-break situation.

Results by round

Matches

{{basketballbox collapsible
 | bg = #BBF3BB | round = 23 | date = 22 February 2019 | time = 21:00 (CEST)
 | report = Boxscore
 | teamA = Real Madrid  | scoreA = 91
 | teamB =  Bayern Munich | scoreB = 78
 | Q1 = 22-17 | Q2 = 20-22 | Q3 = 29-13 | Q4 = 20-26 | points1 = Llull 15 
 | rebounds1 = Tavares 9
 | assist1 = Llull 7
 | rating1 = Deck 18
 | points2 = Barthel 14
 | rebounds2 = Lučić 6
 | assist2 = Hobbs 7
 | rating2 = Lučić 18
 | arena = WiZink Center |place = Madrid | attendance = 10,256
 | referee =  Luigi Lamonica,  Fernando Rocha,  
 }}

Results overview

Euroleague Playoffs

QuarterfinalsReal Madrid win the series 3-0

Euroleague Final Four

Semi-final

Third place game

Copa del Rey

Quarterfinals

Semifinals

Final

Supercopa de España

Semifinals

Semifinals

Final

References

External links
 Official website
 Real Madrid  at ACB.com 
 Real Madrid at EuroLeague.net

 
Real
Madrid